Eleanor Margaret Burbidge, FRS (12 August 1919 – 5 April 2020) was a British-American observational astronomer and astrophysicist. In the 1950s, she was one of the founders of stellar nucleosynthesis and was first author of the influential B2FH paper. During the 1960s and 1970s she worked on galaxy rotation curves and quasars, discovering the most distant astronomical object then known. In the 1980s and 90s she helped develop and utilise the Faint Object Spectrograph on the Hubble Space Telescope. Burbidge was well known for her work opposing discrimination against women in astronomy.

Burbidge held several leadership and administrative posts, including Director of the Royal Greenwich Observatory (1973–1975), President of the American Astronomical Society (1976–1978), and President of the American Association for the Advancement of Science (1983). Burbidge worked at the University of London Observatory, Yerkes Observatory of the University of Chicago, the Cavendish Laboratory of the University of Cambridge, the California Institute of Technology, and the University of California San Diego (UCSD). From 1979 to 1988 she was the first director of the Center for Astronomy and Space Sciences at UCSD, where she worked from 1962 until her retirement.

Research career 
Burbidge studied at University College London (UCL), where she received an undergraduate degree in 1939 and a Ph.D. in 1943. During the Second World War, she acted as a caretaker at University of London Observatory (ULO); the wartime blackout made it easier for her to use the observatory's telescopes. In August 1944, her observations at ULO were twice interrupted by V-1 flying bomb explosions nearby. She was turned down for a postdoctoral fellowship from Carnegie Observatories in 1945 because the job required observing at Mount Wilson Observatory, which was reserved for men only at that time. Shortly after the war, she taught astronomy at ULO to undergraduate students from across the University of London system, including Arthur C. Clarke who was then an undergraduate at King's College London.

In 1951 she took a position at the University of Chicago's Yerkes Observatory, Wisconsin, her first job in the United States. Her research during this period focused on the abundances of chemical elements in stars. She returned to the UK in 1953, when Margaret and her husband Geoffrey Burbidge were invited to work with William Alfred Fowler and Fred Hoyle at the University of Cambridge. The team combined data on elemental abundances produced by the Burbidges with Hoyle's hypothesis that all chemical elements might be produced in stars by a series of nuclear reactions, and Fowler's laboratory experiments on those reactions. The idea became known as stellar nucleosynthesis. They published their model in a series of papers, culminating in a magnum opus in 1957, now known as the B2FH paper after the initials of Burbidge, Burbidge, Fowler & Hoyle. Margaret Burbidge was the first author of the paper, which was written while she was pregnant. The paper demonstrated that most heavier chemical elements were formed in stellar evolution. The theory they developed remains the fundamental basis for stellar nucleosynthesis. Fowler was later awarded the 1983 Nobel Prize in Physics (shared with Subrahmanyan Chandrasekhar) for his work on nucleosynthesis, and expressed surprise that Burbidge was not included.

When Fowler moved back to the U.S., he advised the Burbidges to come with him to California, suggesting Margaret (the observer) should re-apply for the fellowship at Mount Wilson Observatory while Geoff (the theorist) should seek the Kellogg Fellowship at Caltech. Margaret's application was again refused on gender grounds, so the couple swapped applications. Geoff won the position at Mount Wilson, while Margaret took the Caltech job in 1955. Whenever Geoff was required to go observing on Mount Wilson, Margaret would accompany him, ostensibly as his assistant. In reality, Geoff worked in the photographic dark room while Margaret operated the telescope. When the observatory's management found out, they eventually agreed that she could observe there, but only if she and her husband stayed in a separate self-catered cottage on the grounds, rather than the catered dormitory which had been designed for men only.

She joined the University of California San Diego (UCSD) in 1962. In the 1960s and 1970s she measured the masses, compositions, and rotation curves of galaxies and performed early spectroscopic studies of quasars. Her discoveries in this area included QSO B1442+101 at a redshift of 3.5, making it the most distant known object at the time, a record which she held from 1974 to 1982. She was a supporter of the steady state theory of cosmology, but her own work on quasars helped to support the alternative Big Bang theory.

In 1972 Burbidge became director of the Royal Greenwich Observatory (RGO), on secondment from UCSD. For 300 years the post had always been held by the Astronomer Royal, but when Burbidge was appointed to the RGO directorship the posts were split, with radio astronomer Martin Ryle appointed as Astronomer Royal. Burbidge sometimes attributed this to sexism, and at other times to politics intended to reduce the clout of the RGO director. Burbidge left the RGO in 1974, fifteen months after joining, due to controversy over moving the Isaac Newton Telescope from RGO headquarters at Herstmonceux Castle to Roque de los Muchachos Observatory in the Canary Islands.

Burbidge campaigned in opposition to discrimination against women in astronomy and was also opposed to positive discrimination. In 1972 she turned down the Annie J. Cannon Award of the American Astronomical Society (AAS) because it was awarded to women only: "It is high time that discrimination in favor of, as well as against, women in professional life be removed". Her letter declining the prize caused the AAS to set up its first committee on the status of women in astronomy. In 1976, she became the first female president of the AAS. During her term as president she convinced the members to ban AAS meetings in states which had not ratified the Equal Rights Amendment to the US Constitution. In 1984 the AAS awarded her its highest honor, regardless of gender, the Henry Norris Russell Lectureship.

From 1979 to 1988, she served as the first director of the UCSD's Center for Astrophysics and Space Science. In 1981 she was elected President of the American Association for the Advancement of Science (AAAS), serving her one-year term from February 1982 to February 1983.

At UCSD she helped develop the Faint Object Spectrograph for the Hubble Space Telescope, which launched in 1990. With this instrument, she and her team discovered that the galaxy Messier 82 contains a supermassive black hole at its center. As professor emerita at UCSD she continued to be active in research until the early 21st century. Burbidge authored over 370 research papers.

Personal life
Eleanor Margaret Peachey was born in Davenport, Stockport, UK, nine months after the Armistice of 11 November 1918 that ended the First World War. She was the daughter of Marjorie Stott Peachey and Stanley John Peachey. She first became interested in astronomy aged 3 or 4, after seeing the stars on a ferry trip across the English Channel. By age 12, she was reading astronomy textbooks by James Jeans, a distant relative of her mother.

On 2 April 1948, Margaret Peachey married Geoffrey Burbidge. The couple had met six months earlier at University College London. Geoffrey was a theoretical physicist, but Margaret's passion for astronomy convinced him to switch to theoretical astrophysics. The two collaborated on much of their subsequent research. The couple had a daughter, Sarah, who was born in late 1956. In 1977, Margaret became a United States citizen. Geoffrey Burbidge died in 2010. Margaret Burbidge died on 5 April 2020, in San Francisco at age 100 after a fall.

Honors

Awards
 Helen B. Warner Prize for Astronomy, 1959, awarded jointly with Geoffrey Burbidge, for the B2FH paper
 Fellow of the Royal Society, 1964
 Fellow of the American Academy of Arts and Sciences (1969)
 President, American Astronomical Society (1976-1978)
 Karl G. Jansky Lecturer, National Radio Astronomy Observatory (1977)
 Member of the National Academy of Sciences (1978)
 Member of the American Philosophical Society (1980)
 Catherine Wolfe Bruce medal of the Astronomical Society of the Pacific (1982)
 National Medal of Science (1983)
 President, American Association for the Advancement of Science (1983)
 Henry Norris Russell Lectureship (1984)
 Association pour le Développement International de l'Observatoire de Nice (ADION) medal (1987)
 Albert Einstein World Award of Science (1988)
 Inducted into the Women's Museum of California Hall of Fame (2003)
 Gold Medal of the Royal Astronomical Society, with Geoffrey Burbidge (2005)
 Inaugural Fellow of the American Astronomical Society (2020)

Named after her
 Asteroid 5490 Burbidge
 Margaret Burbidge Award of the American Physical Society

See also
 Timeline of women in science

References

Further reading 
 Her autobiography:

External links 
  — Short biography 
  — Personal web page at UCSD physics.

1919 births
Members of the United States National Academy of Sciences
2020 deaths
American astrophysicists
British astrophysicists
American women astronomers
20th-century American astronomers
20th-century British astronomers
British emigrants to the United States
People with acquired American citizenship
University of Chicago faculty
University of California, San Diego faculty
Alumni of University College London
Albert Einstein World Award of Science Laureates
National Medal of Science laureates
American centenarians
British centenarians
Fellows of the American Academy of Arts and Sciences
Female Fellows of the Royal Society
Fellows of Girton College, Cambridge
Recipients of the Gold Medal of the Royal Astronomical Society
Fellows of the Royal Society
20th-century American women scientists
Women centenarians
English centenarians
Fellows of the American Astronomical Society
People from Stockport
21st-century American women
Members of the American Philosophical Society